Sirzar or Sir Zar may refer to:
 Sirzar, Lorestan
 Sirzar, Kalat, Razavi Khorasan Province
 Sir Zar, Zavin, Razavi Khorasan Province
 Sirzar, Mashhad, Razavi Khorasan Province